Yadadri Bhuvanagiri District, is a district in the Indian state of Telangana. The administrative headquarters is located at Bhuvanagiri Town. The district shares boundaries with Suryapet, Nalgonda, Jangaon, Siddipet, Medchal-Malkajgiri and Rangareddy districts. It was carved out of Nalgonda district on 11 October 2016 during a large reorganization of the districts of Telangana.

Geography 

Demographics 

 Census of India, the district has a population of 726,465. According to the 2011 census, 90.54% of the district speaks Telugu, 4.97% Lambadi and 3.42% Urdu.

Major Towns 

Bhuvanagiri
Choutuppal
Alair
Mothkur

Notable places in District 

Bhuvanagiri Fort in Bhuvanagiri
Kolanupaka Temple in Alair - 33 km from Bhuvanagiri
Kunda Sathyanarayana Kala Dhamam-13 km from Bhuvanagiri
Yadadri temple -16 km from Bhuvanagiri
Ramaneswaram temple in Nagireddypally-15 km from Bhuvanagiri

Administrative divisions 
The district has two revenue divisions of Bhuvanagiri and Choutuppal. It is sub-divided into 16 mandals. Smt. Pamela Satpathy, IAS is the present collector of the district.

Mandals

See also 
 List of districts in Telangana

References 

Districts of Telangana
Bhuvanagiri District